Bernard Looney  (born 1970) is an Irish businessman and CEO of BP. During Looney's tenure as CEO of BP, he promised to end BP's relationship with Rosneft, the Russian state-owned energy giant, amid Russia's 2022 invasion of Ukraine. Looney was a member of Rosneft's board until February 2022.

Early life
Looney was born in County Kerry, and was raised on a small dairy farm in Ashgrove, near Kenmare. He was the first in his family to attend a university.   Looney earned a degree in electrical engineering from University College Dublin and a master's in management from Stanford Graduate School of Business. Looney is a fellow of the Royal Academy of Engineering, and a fellow of the Energy Institute.

Career
Looney, who has spent his entire career at BP, worked in core production and drilling roles in the North Sea, Vietnam and Mexico, serving in other executive roles before taking over the upstream division in 2016.

In October 2019, it was announced that Looney would succeed Bob Dudley as group chief executive in February 2020.

He sold BP shares worth £7.8 million in February and April 2019.

Response to the 2022 Russian invasion of Ukraine  
Looney, by virtue of BP's 20% stake in Moscow-based oil-producer Rosneft, formerly served alongside Igor Sechin, who is the chief executive officer, president and chairman of Rosneft's management board. 

On 25 February 2022, Looney engaged in talks with the British Secretary of State for Business, Kwasi Kwarteng. The Government of the United Kingdom reportedly asked Looney to relinquish BP's 20% stake in the Russian state-owned oil firm Rosneft, which has strong ties to Russian oligarchs and the Kremlin, in the wake of the Russian invasion of Ukraine.

COP27 controversy 
Looney attended COP27 as a delegate of the western African nation of Mauritania where BP has major fossil fuel investments. His attendance was criticised by activists who were unhappy at the influence of executives from fossil fuel companies at the conference.

2023 Bonus controversy 
In March 2023, the payout of Bernard Looney, the CEO of BP, has been criticized by campaigners as a “kick in the teeth” for consumers facing the cost of living crisis, as his pay package more than doubled to £10m following BP’s record profits linked to the war in Ukraine.

Looney’s package included a salary of £1.4m, a bonus of £2.4m, and a £6m share award, as well as benefits, which is 120% more than the £4.5m he received in 2021.

Personal life
Looney lives in central London, England.

References

Living people
1970 births
Alumni of University College Dublin
BP people
Fellows of the Royal Academy of Engineering
Irish chief executives
People from Kenmare
Stanford Graduate School of Business alumni